Myrmechixenus is a genus of beetles belonging to the family Tenebrionidae.

The species of this genus are found in Europe and Northern America.

Species:
 Myrmechixenus lathridioides Crotch, 1873 
 Myrmechixenus picinus (Aubé, 1850)

References

Tenebrionidae